Maurice Taylor (born 5 May 1926) was the Roman Catholic Bishop of the Diocese of Galloway, Scotland, from 1981 until 2004.

Born in Hamilton, Lanarkshire, he attended St Cuthbert's Primary, Burnbank, before going on to St. Aloysius' College, Glasgow, and, later, Our Lady's High School, Motherwell. He studied philosophy at Blairs College, Kincardineshire, from 1942 to 1944 and then served in the Royal Army Medical Corps, at home, in India and in Egypt. He attended the Pontifical Scots College, Rome from 1947 to 1951, studying theology at the Gregorian University and being ordained a priest in Rome on 2 July 1950. After a year as assistant priest in St Bartholomew's, Coatbridge, he returned to Rome in 1952 where he took his doctorate in theology in 1954. For 10 years from August 1955 he taught philosophy and theology at St Peter's College, Cardross.

From 1965 until 1974 he was rector of the Royal Scots College, Valladolid, Spain. He was ordained Bishop of Galloway by Cardinal Gordon Gray on 9 June 1981. For more than ten years he represented Scotland on the Episcopal Board of the International Commission on English in the Liturgy (ICEL), and was its chairman from 1997 until 2002. He retired as bishop in 2004 and was succeeded by John Cunningham.

In 2013, it was revealed that Diocese priest Paul Moore had confessed to Taylor that he sexually abused a boy the year prior and that Taylor opted to send Moore to a treatment centre in Toronto and to Fort Augustus Abbey in the Highlands instead of turning him into the authorities. Taylor later cooperated during Moore's trial, which resulted in a conviction in 2018.

References

 Maurice Taylor
 The Catholic Directory for Scotland 2004 (Glasgow 2004)

1926 births
Living people
20th-century Roman Catholic bishops in Scotland
21st-century Roman Catholic bishops in Scotland
Bishops of Galloway (Roman Catholic, Post-Reformation)
British Army personnel of World War II
People from Hamilton, South Lanarkshire
People educated at St Aloysius' College, Glasgow
Royal Army Medical Corps soldiers
Pontifical Gregorian University alumni
Scottish Roman Catholic bishops